A title sequence (also called an opening sequence or intro) is the method by which films or television programmes present their title and key production and cast members, utilizing conceptual visuals and sound (often an opening theme song with visuals, akin to a brief music video). It typically includes (or begins) the text of the opening credits, and helps establish the setting and tone of the program. It may consist of live action, animation, music, still images, and/or graphics. In some films, the title sequence is preceded by a cold open.

History

Since the invention of the cinematograph, simple title cards were used to begin and end silent film presentations in order to identify both the film and the production company involved, and to act as a signal to viewers that the film had started and then finished. In silent cinema, title cards or intertitles were used throughout to convey dialogue and plot, and it is in some of these early short films that we see the first examples of title sequences themselves, being quite literally a series of title cards shown at the beginning of a film. With the arrival of sound, the sequence was usually accompanied by a musical prelude or overture.

Slowly, title sequences evolved to become more elaborate pieces of film. The advent of television was a pivotal moment for title design because it forced the major film studios to invest in making cinema more attractive in order to win back a diminishing audience. The "cast of thousands" epics shot on various patent widescreen formats were a direct response to television's successful invasion of the leisure marketplace. Part of cinema's new prestigious and expansive quality were orchestral overtures before the curtains opened and long title sequences — all designed to convey a sense of gravitas it was hoped television would be unable to compete with. As cinema's title sequences grew longer and more elaborate, the involvement of prominent graphic designers including Saul Bass and Maurice Binder became more common. The title sequence for Alfred Hitchcock's North by Northwest is generally cited as the first to feature extended use of kinetic typography. This innovation, in turn, influenced the 1960s television predilection for title design, resulting in the creation of strong graphics-led sequences for many television shows. Since then, the mediums of film and television have engaged in a kind of push and pull behavior, inspiring and spurring each other in different directions.

There have been several such pivotal moments in title design history. The introduction of digital technologies in the late 1980s and early 1990s to film and television changed both industries, and accordingly the 1990s saw a resurgence in title design. Ironically, a key sequence in this resurgence was the main title to David Fincher's Se7en, designed by Kyle Cooper while at R/GA, which was created using primarily analogue means. The title opticals for Se7en were created by Cinema Research Corporation, the leading title company in the 1990s. Soon thereafter, television followed suit and networks like HBO began to develop more cinematic experiences for television, including more elaborate and considered title sequences. For example, when The Sopranos first aired in 1999, it was only the second hour-long television drama that HBO had ever produced. Its title sequence "helped lend the show a credibility and gravitas normally reserved for cinema, giving it a stronger foothold in the mind and memory of the audience."

As of the beginning of the 21st century, title sequences can be found bookending a variety of media besides film and television including video games, conferences, and even music videos.

Films
Some films have employed unusual and fairly elaborate title sequences since the late 1910s; in America this practice became more common in the 1930s. In the 1936 film Show Boat, cut-out figures on a revolving turntable carried overhead banners which displayed the opening credits. This opening sequence was designed by John Harkrider, who created the costumes for the original 1927 Broadway production of the musical.

In several films, the opening credits have appeared against a background of (sometimes moving) clouds. These include The Wizard of Oz (1939), Till the Clouds Roll By (1946), the David Lean Oliver Twist (1948), and the 1961 King of Kings.

In 1947, the Technicolor film Sinbad the Sailor, the letters of the opening credits seem to form from colored water gushing into a fountain.

Film titles and credits usually appear in written form, but occasionally they are spoken instead. The first example of this in American cinema was The Terror (1928). There are also a few cases in which titles and credits are sung, including the musicals Sweet Rosie O'Grady (1943) and Meet Me After the Show (1951).

Since the late 1950s, film title sequences have been a showcase for contemporary design and illustration. The title sequences of Saul Bass and Maurice Binder are among the best examples of this. They also inspired many imitators both in cinema and on television.

In the 1959 film Ben-Hur, the opening credits were set against the background of the "Creation of Man" in Michelangelo's Sistine Chapel ceiling. As the credits progressed, the camera slowly zoomed in on the Hand of God outstretched toward Adam.

In 1976, Saul Bass designed a title sequence for That's Entertainment, Part II in which he paid homage to a range of title sequences from earlier Hollywood films and replicated several novelty title sequences from the 1930s including Maytime (1937).

Kyle Cooper's title sequence for David Fincher's Seven (1995) influenced a whole host of designers in the late 1990s. Its aesthetic has "been co-opted almost wholesale by the horror genre as a house style".

Kenneth Branagh's Hamlet (1996) actually has no opening title sequence. The only credits seen at the beginning are the name of the production company, Shakespeare's name, and the title of the film. However, the title is shown by means of the camera slowly panning across the base of the statue of the dead king Hamlet, whose ghost will appear in three scenes of the film, and who will play a crucial role in the story.

Television

Title sequences for television series have routinely played a central role in establishing the show's identity. Repeated at the beginning of every new and rebroadcast episode, usually with limited changes over the course of the series' run, they can become highly memorable. Theme music played during the sequence may be remembered clearly by viewers decades later.

Title sequences can take a variety of forms, incorporating different elements. A song may summarize the backstory or premise of the series, such as for The Brady Bunch, The Beverly Hillbillies, or Mister Ed. Less commonly, a voice-over may serve the same function, as for Star Trek, Quantum Leap, or The Twilight Zone. Often a song will more generally set the theme of the series, such as for WKRP in Cincinnati, Cheers, or All in the Family. An instrumental piece may be used the same way, as for Taxi, The Bob Newhart Show, or Dallas. A title sequence will at some point badge the show with a typographic logo. Visuals may be used to quickly present the backstory, as in I Dream of Jeannie or Gilligan's Island. Because it is produced at the outset of a series, the sequence will usually include visuals taken from early episodes already shot when it was prepared. Short clips of key characters may be used to introduce them and to credit the actors playing them, as with The Love Boat. In and around these elements may be other footage depicting the setting, or examples of scenes common to the show (e.g. car chases for a police drama, household activities for a sitcom, singing and dancing for a variety show).

Although a title sequence may be modified during a series to update cast changes or incorporate new "highlight" shots from later episodes, it will tend to remain largely the same for an entire season. Some shows have had several quite different title sequences and theme music throughout their runs, while in contrast some ever-popular shows have retained their original title sequences for decades with only minor alterations. Conversely, retaining a series' original title sequence can allow a producer to change many key elements within a programme itself, without losing the show's on-screen identity. Other variations include changing only the theme music whilst keeping the visuals or vice versa.

Some series make minor changes to the title sequence of each episode, such as superimposing a different episode title on each one. Others make minor alterations to the content of the sequence itself, to keep them from being completely repetitive each episode and to reward attentive viewers. For example, The Rockford Files would feature a different message left on the title character's answering machine, and The Simpsons features several unique elements in the title sequence of each episode (e.g. the couch gag).

In anime series, opening and ending title sequences have evolved into a distinct art form in their own right: due to the running length of a half-hour block of programming on Japanese television providing more time for the actual episode as opposed to commercials, an episode is able to budget one-and-one-half minutes each for an OP opening sequence) and ED (ending sequence). These will invariably feature pieces of vocal music, sometimes sung by members of the voice cast for the program, and will have unique animation that thematically serves to open and close the episode; often, guest animators will be brought in to direct and provide key animation for these sequences. The OP credits will usually include director, producer, animation director, studio, music, and OP animation credits: detailed staff and voice cast is almost always reserved for the ED. In anime produced primarily for an audience of young children, karaoke lyrics to the song will sometimes be provided at the bottom of the opening and ending sequences. For further information on anime openings, see Music in Japanese animation.

Television specials, especially of classic works, sometimes contain unusual opening credit sequences. In the title sequence of Mikhail Baryshnikov's 1977 version of Tchaikovsky's ballet The Nutcracker, for example, we see closeups, freeze-frame and slow-motion shots of Baryshnikov and female lead Gelsey Kirkland "warming up" for the ballet. When the actual title appears on the screen we see Baryshnikov in his nutcracker costume and mask leaping into the air in slow motion and freeze frame. The "Overture Miniature" is heard during the opening credits.

In contemporary television news a title sequence can be changed every day, by including footage of that day's news with a presenter's voice "teasing" the items. This ensures that the title sequence appears fresh but still identifies the news program by its music and visual style.

In 2010, TV Guide published a list of American TV's top 10 credits sequences, as selected by readers. The series, in order of first to tenth, were: The Simpsons, Get Smart, The Mary Tyler Moore Show, the original Hawaii Five-O, True Blood, The Big Bang Theory, Dexter, The Brady Bunch, Mad Men, and The Sopranos.

Video games

The animated introduction, attract mode, title screen, and title sequence have been a major part of video games for decades. However, it is only recently that game title sequences have been able to match the quality and fidelity of film and television titles.

Deus Ex: Human Revolution by Eidos Montréal and The Last of Us by Naughty Dog are two recent examples of Triple-A games that have employed film-style opening title sequences. Professor Layton and the Lost Future had the title following some gameplay setting up the story.

See also
 Acknowledgment (creative arts and sciences)
 Billing (filmmaking)
 Character generator
 Cinema Research Corporation
 Closing credits
 Credit (creative arts)
 Digital on-screen graphic (BUG)
 Lower third
 Opening credits
 Production logo
 Theme music
 WGA screenwriting credit system

References

External links
 Art of the Title – A compendium and leading web resource of film and television title design from around the world
 Forget the Film, Watch the Titles – A collection of title sequences and interviews with their creators
 Detailed dissection of the title sequence for Space: 1999
 Real "Ends" Final
 Original Doctor Who opening credits
 The Morrison Studio – Title sequence company, led by Richard Morrison and Dean Wares

Film and television opening sequences
Articles containing video clips
Film and video terminology
Television terminology